Everton F.C. has competed in the FA Cup since the 1886-87 season. The FA Cup is an annual knockout football competition in men's domestic English football. First played during the 1871–72 season, it is the oldest national football competition in the world.

The club has won the trophy on five occasions: in 1907, 1933, 1966, 1984, and 1995, as well as finishing second in 1893, 1897, 1907, 1968, 1985, 1986, 1989, and 2009. Although the club was formed in 1878, Everton did not participate in the FA Cup until 1886, where they did not play a single game because of a walkover. In the 1888-89 FA Cup, Everton did not enter the competition out of protest for the first and only time (after already having played in prior seasons).

Results

Results by season

Records

Statistics

Winning FA Cups

Top Scorers

References

Everton F.C.
FA Cup